Events from the year 1743 in Spain

Incumbents
 Monarch – Philip V

Events
 March 2 – Battle of La Guaira: Spanish victory over the British.

Births
 June 3 – José Fernando de Abascal y Sousa, Spanish viceroy of Peru (d. 1821)

References

 
1740s in Spain
Years of the 18th century in Spain